The University of Arizona CPV Array is a 2.38 MWp (2.0 MWAC) concentrator photovoltaics (CPV) power station in Tucson, Arizona.  It consists of 34 Amonix 7700 systems constructed in the Solar Zone of the University of Arizona's Science and Technology Park (UASTP).

It uses all three of the methods available to increase efficiency: dual-axis tracking, fresnel lens sunlight concentrators, and multi-junction cells.
 
The annual electricity production is expected to be about 3.5 GW·h, and is being sold to Tucson Electric Power (TEP) under a 20-year power purchase agreement (PPA).

Electricity production

See also

 Alamosa Solar Generating Project
 Hatch Solar Energy Center
 List of photovoltaic power stations
 Renewable energy in the United States
 Solar power in the United States

References

External links
  VIDEO: 2 MW of Amonix CPV Solar Power Inaugurated in Tucson, AZ

Photovoltaic power stations in the United States
Solar power stations in Arizona
Buildings and structures in Tucson, Arizona